The Troy Lasater Service Station is a historic former automotive service station on Arkansas Highway 197 in New Blaine, Arkansas.  It is a small single-story stone structure with a gabled roof, set in a small grassy area at the junction of AR 197 and Wood Lane.  A cross gable is set above the entrance, which is on the left of the three-bay main facade.  It was built in 1935 by Freeborn and Troy Lasater, and is a locally distinctive example of vernacular English Revival architecture.  It was operated as a single-pump service station into the 1940s.

The building was listed on the National Register of Historic Places in 2002.

See also
National Register of Historic Places listings in Logan County, Arkansas

References

Gas stations on the National Register of Historic Places in Arkansas
National Register of Historic Places in Logan County, Arkansas
Buildings and structures completed in 1935
Buildings and structures in Logan County, Arkansas
1935 establishments in Arkansas